James Stephen Lindsay (born June 8, 1979), known professionally as James A. Lindsay, is an American author, cultural critic, mathematician and conspiracy theorist. He is known for the grievance studies affair, in which he, Peter Boghossian and Helen Pluckrose submitted hoax articles to academic journals in 2017 and 2018. Lindsay has written several books including Cynical Theories (2020), which he co-authored with Pluckrose.

Early life and career 
James Stephen Lindsay was born in Ogdensburg, New York. He moved to Maryville, Tennessee, at the age of five, later graduating from Maryville High School in 1997. Lindsay attended Tennessee Tech, where he obtained both his B.S. and M.S. in mathematics; he later earned his Ph.D. in mathematics from the University of Tennessee in 2010. His doctoral thesis is titled "Combinatorial Unification of Binomial-Like Arrays", and his advisor was Carl G. Wagner. After completing his degree, Lindsay left academia and returned to his hometown, where he worked as a massage therapist.

Lindsay began using the middle initial "A." as a "thin veneer of pseudonym" to write books about atheism and leftism in the predominantly conservative and Christian South.

Lindsay, along with Peter Boghossian, is the co-author of How to Have Impossible Conversations: A Very Practical Guide, a nonfiction book released in 2019 and published by Lifelong Books. In 2020, Lindsay released the nonfiction book Cynical Theories, co-authored with Helen Pluckrose and published by Pitchstone Publishing. The book became a Wall Street Journal, USA Today, and Publishers Weekly bestseller upon release. Harvard University psychologist Steven Pinker praised the book for exposing "the surprisingly shallow intellectual roots of the movements that appear to be engulfing our culture". Tim Smith-Laing charged it with "leaping from history to hysteria" in a Daily Telegraph review.

Lindsay is the founder of the website New Discourses, which is owned by Christian nationalist commentator Michael O’Fallon.

Lindsay has also appeared three times on comedian Joe Rogan's podcast The Joe Rogan Experience.

In August 2022, Lindsay was permanently suspended from Twitter. His account was reinstated in November 2022 after Elon Musk's acquisition of Twitter.

Grievance studies affair 

In 2017, Lindsay and Boghossian published a hoax paper titled "The Conceptual Penis as a Social Construct". In writing the paper, Lindsay and Boghossian intended to imitate the style of "poststructuralist discursive gender theory". The paper argued that the penis should be seen "not as an anatomical organ but as a social construct isomorphic to performative toxic masculinity". After the paper was rejected by Norma, they later submitted it to Cogent Social Sciences where it was accepted for publication.

Beginning in August 2017, Lindsay, Boghossian, and Pluckrose wrote 20 hoax papers, which they submitted to peer-reviewed journals using several pseudonyms as well as the name of Richard Baldwin, a friend of Boghossian and professor emeritus of history at Florida’s Gulf Coast State College. The project ended early after one of the papers, published in the feminist geography journal Gender, Place and Culture, was questioned by investigative journalist Toni Airaksinen of Campus Reform who realized the article wasn't real due to its lack of following academic journal publish standards, which caused widespread interest and was covered by multiple journalists. 

The trio subsequently revealed the full scope of their work in a YouTube video created and released by documentary filmmaker Mike Nayna, which was accompanied by an investigation by The Wall Street Journal. By the time of this revelation, seven of their twenty papers had been accepted, seven were still under review, and six had been rejected. One paper, accepted by feminist social work journal Affilia, contained passages copied from Adolf Hitler's Mein Kampf with feminist language added, though sociologist  has contended that the paper only contained similarities in structure, and did not contain material "historically specific in Hitler's text (racism, references to the First World War, and so on)".

Academic reviewers had praised the hoax studies of Lindsay, Boghossian, and Pluckrose as "a rich and exciting contribution to the study of ... the intersection between masculinity and anality", "excellent and very timely", and "important dialogue for social workers and feminist scholars".

Views 
Lindsay has supported Democratic Party candidates, including volunteering for Barack Obama, and was part of the New Atheism movement. He said in 2022 that he originally identified with the left, though he had stopped considering himself a liberal. Lindsay stated that he does not "really" consider himself a conservative, but added: "I do notice that when I talk about conservatives now, I tend to use the pronoun 'we'. So maybe on some psychological level, getting down in there, I’ve started to identify, but I don’t know if I mean 'we' conservatives or 'we' people who are standing up for broadly classically liberal values like the United States was founded upon. Team Reality, if you will. And if that's conservative, so be it".

Lindsay is a critic of "woke culture", which he analogizes to religious belief. He describes "the Social Justice Movement" as his "ideological enemy". Though he opposed Donald Trump in the 2016 United States presidential election, Lindsay announced his intention to vote for Trump in the 2020 election, arguing that the danger of "wokeness" is much greater than that of a Trump presidency.

Conspiracy theory promotion

Lindsay has promoted and/or been linked to several prominent conspiracy theories. 

He is a proponent of the right-wing LGBT grooming conspiracy theory and has been credited as one of several public figures responsible for popularizing "groomer" as a slur directed at LGBTQ educators and activists by members of the political right. Lindsay has referred to the Pride flag as "the flag of a hostile enemy."

In 2021, Lindsay wrote on Twitter that "there will be" a genocide of whites if critical race theory "isn't stopped." His statement was met with widespread criticism, including from founder of libertarian anti-identity politics magazine Quillette Claire Lehmann who wrote: "James Lindsay is now peddling White Genocide Theory. Implying that a genocide against whites in the U.S. is imminent has the potential to inspire racist violence. Such comments are extreme, reckless, and irresponsible. They should be denounced."

Lindsay has promoted the far-right Cultural Marxism conspiracy theory, which alleges a concerted effort by Marxist critical theorists to infiltrate academic and cultural institutions in order to destroy Western civilization. The theory has been wholly rejected by mainstream scholars, and has been characterized as antisemitic by the Southern Poverty Law Center and others. Lindsay has denied charges of antisemitism and has argued that the term "cultural marxism" is not inherently antisemitic.

Works
 God Doesn't; We Do: Only Humans Can Solve Human Challenges. 2012.
 Dot, Dot, Dot: Infinity Plus God Equals Folly. Onus Books. 2013.
 Everybody Is Wrong About God. Pitchstone Publishing. 2015.
 Life in Light of Death. Pitchstone Publishing. 2016.
 How to Have Impossible Conversations: A Very Practical Guide (with Peter Boghossian). Hachette Books. 2019.
 Cynical Theories (with Helen Pluckrose). Pitchstone Publishing. 2020.
 Counter Wokecraft (with Charles Pincourt). Independently published. 2021.
 Race Marxism: The Truth About Critical Race Theory and Praxis. Independently published. 2022.

References

1979 births
Living people
21st-century American mathematicians
21st-century American non-fiction writers
American atheists
American conspiracy theorists
American podcasters
American political commentators
Anti-LGBT sentiment
Conservatism in the United States
Critics of postmodernism
Mathematicians from Tennessee
New Atheism
People from Maryville, Tennessee
People from Ogdensburg, New York
Tennessee Technological University alumni
University of Tennessee alumni
White genocide conspiracy theory
Hoaxers